Bouchon (also known as Bouchon Bistro) is a French-style restaurant with locations in Yountville, California and Las Vegas. The restaurant was founded by Thomas Keller in 1998.

The Yountville location was awarded a star by the Michelin Guide for its 2007 edition, but lost it fifteen years later with the 2022 update.

Menu
Bouchon serves French bistro-style food customarily found in Europe; its culinary style has been described as informal with minimalist elements.

Bouchon Bakery
Keller started and expanded Bouchon Bakery, a casual café which offers lower priced pastries. In 2012, Keller wrote a cookbook, Bouchon Bakery, based on recipes from the café.

References

External links

Restaurants in California
French restaurants in California
Napa Valley
Restaurants in the Las Vegas Valley
Restaurants in the San Francisco Bay Area
Companies based in Napa County, California
Restaurants established in 1998
1998 establishments in California